Richard Feldman may refer to:

 Richard Feldman (cyclist) (born 1969), American bicycle racer
 Richard Feldman (songwriter), American songwriter and producer
 Richard Feldman, interim president of the University of Rochester, 2017–2019